Fort Phantom Hill is a former United States Army installation located in Jones County, Texas. The fort was established in 1851 as part of a line of forts in Texas to protect migrants passing through the state on their way to California. The US Army abandoned the fort in 1854 and it was shortly thereafter mostly destroyed by fire. In 1858, it became a station of the Butterfield-Overland Mail route until it moved out of Texas with the beginning of the American Civil War in 1861. During the war, the fort was occupied by Confederate frontier troops until the Confederacy's defeat and surrender. Following the US Army's return to Texas after the Civil War, Fort Phantom Hill was used as a subpost of the larger, newer Fort Griffin until 1875.

After its final abandonment in 1875, a town was established at Fort Phantom Hill that, after flourishing in the 1870s, ceased to exist by 1900. Following the fort's purchase by a John Guitar in 1928, there was renewed public interest in the fort that led to its opening to the public in 1972. In 1997, Fort Phantom Hill was transferred to the Fort Phantom Hill Foundation. The ruins of the fort were added to the National Register of Historic Places on September 14, 1972.

Use as military outpost
Fort Phantom Hill was established during the American colonization of Texas, a process that began in the 1820s with the immigration of Anglo-Americans into Spanish, later Mexican, Texas. After existing as an independent republic for a decade, Texas was annexed by the United States of America in 1845, which led to the start of the Mexican-American War the next year. The United States defeated Mexico, and in the treaty that ended the war in 1848 annexed what is presently the Southwestern United States. The United States Army began to establish outposts and construct roads in Texas during the war to protect and facilitate white settlements and traffic in the state and its border with Mexico. In 1849, an unprecedented number of white migrants began crossing Texas to each California following the discovery of gold there.

Those migrants moved along routes such as the Marcy Trail, charted by US Army officer Randolph B. Marcy in 1849, through the territory of the indigenous peoples of the Great Plains. To protect those migrants, the US Army established an  line of forts from Fort Worth to Fort Duncan in 1848–49, and then began to construct a second line farther west in 1851. The forts of that line – Belknap, Chadbourne, Clark, Davis, Mason, McKavett, Phantom Hill, Stockton, and Terrett – were established in the early 1850s at places Marcy recommended. One of those places was the Clear Fork of the Brazos River, which Marcy noted in 1849 as being abundant in water and game; what he had witnessed was actually the byproduct of unusually high rainfall for that area that year.

Use as permanent garrison, 1851–1854
In 1851, General William G. Belknap, commander of the Seventh Military District—an area corresponding to the present states of Arkansas and Oklahoma—visited the Brazos River valley with Marcy to find locations for outposts. He began construction of what became Fort Belknap, and identified the Pecan Bayou as ideal for a second post on the Brazos. On November 3, 1851, General Persifor Frazer Smith, assigned command of the area by the time he assumed command of the Department of Texas on September 16, 1851, ordered that an outpost be created upon the "Phantom Hill" overlooking the Clear Fork,  from Pecan Bayou.

On November 14, 1851, five companies of the 5th Infantry Regiment, commanded by Lieutenant Colonel (brevet) John Joseph Abercrombie, arrived on Phantom Hill and established the Camp on the Clear Fork of the Brazos. Construction of Fort Phantom Hill began immediately and lasted until June 1852, and was followed by the creation of a crude road to Fort Chadbourne. Construction and basic life at the fort was complicated by a lack of usable wood and water—which the garrison could not abate even by digging an  well—and of game and fertile soil in the area. Pestilence caused by the poor supply of food and water also plagued the garrison.

Abercrombie and other officers to unsuccessfully request for permission to abandon the site until February 1852. On April 27, 1852, Abercombrie was replaced as commander of Fort Phantom Hill by Lieutenant Colonel Carlos Waite. Waite was himself replaced by Major Henry Hopkins Sibley on September 23, 1853, who oversaw the withdrawal from the post of four of its five companies and their replacement by a company of the 2nd Dragoons. In August 1853, the fort was inspected by Colonel William G. Freeman, who found it and its garrison in poor condition. The fort was ordered abandoned on April 6, 1854, along with Forts Mason and Terrett. Shortly after the garrison's departure, the fort was burned, probably by the departing soldiers.

Subsequent use, 1854–1871
Following Fort Phantom Hill's abandonment, it was still frequently visited by travelers through Texas and US Army troops. Among the latter was Robert E. Lee, who as a lieutenant colonel of the 2nd Cavalry Regiment passed by the fort on June 16, 1856, while in pursuit of the Comanche leader Sanaco. In February 1861, Texas seceded from the United States and joined the Confederate States of America. Major General David E. Twiggs, commander of the Department of Texas since 1857, surrendered its equipment and installations in Texas and abandoned the state as the American Civil War began.

On March 4, 1861, LeRoy Pope Walker, the Confederate Secretary of War, ordered career soldier Benjamin McCulloch to raise a volunteer force of ten companies to defend Texas's frontier. McCulloch passed the task to his brother, Henry Eustace McCulloch, who distributed his forces across the former US Army installations in Texas. One of McCulloch's officers, James Buckner Barry, stationed a portion of his command at Fort Phantom Hill. After a campaign against the Comanche in 1861 quieted the frontier, McCulloch's troops were sent to fight in the Trans-Mississippi theater as part of the 1st Texas Cavalry Regiment. They were replaced with the Frontier Regiment, who also encamped at Fort Phantom Hill were also increasingly pulled away from the frontier as the war continued.

Use as satellite post, 1871–1875
Confederate forces began to surrender to the federal government in 1865, heralding its defeat and the end of the Civil War. In June, the remaining Confederate forces in Texas formally surrendered to the US Army, which reoccupied the state. After initially ignoring Texans' concerns about indigenous raiding in favor of reoccupying pre-war installations along the border with Mexico, the US Army returned to the frontier and began expanding its presence there in 1866–67. From 1869 until the end of the Red River War in 1875, Fort Phantom Hill's ruins were occupied several times by US Army troops as a subpost of Fort Griffin, established in 1867 along on the Clear Fork of the Brazos.

Relationship with Jones County
White settlement in what became Jones County, Texas, began in November 1851 with Fort Phantom Hill and an Indian agent named Jesse Stem, who operated a farmstead near the fort until he was killed by Tonkawa natives in February 1854. As the fort neared completion, more settlers established themselves in the area, but not enough to justify its retention by the US Army in 1854. In 1858, three of the fort's stone buildings were repaired and used for a station of the Butterfield Overland Mail along its route through Texas until it moved out of the state with beginning of the Civil War in 1861. Jones County was established on February 1, 1858, and during the Civil War it suffered from raids by indigenous peoples that halted white settlement in the county for 15 years.

After the Red River War, a settlement was formed on Fort Phantom Hill's grounds that primarily serviced buffalo hunters roaming the region. The town grew to a population of 546 and briefly was the Jones County seat in 1881, but when the Texas and Pacific Railway bypassed Phantom Hill in favor of Abilene,  to the south, the town began a rapid decline. By 1900, it had ceased to exist.

Preservation
In 1928, the grounds of Fort Phantom Hill were purchased by a John Guitar, who then sold the land in 1969 to his grandson, Jim Alexander. Guitar's purchase of the fort attracted the attention of Carl Coke Rister, a historian, professor at Hardin-Simmons University, and secretary of the West Texas Historical Association, who popularized the fort. In 1970, the fort was excavated by the Texas state archaeologist, Curtis Tunnell, and on September 14, 1972, it was included on the National Register of Historic Places following its nomination by the Texas Historical Commission on January 31, 1972. The Alexanders opened the fort to the public in the same year and, in 1997, transferred its grounds to the Fort Phantom Foundation. Another, more complete excavation of the fort's grounds was carried out in 1998 by Texas Tech University. The Texas Department of Transportation constructed a rest stop along the southern edge of the fort's grounds in 2012.

Four historical markers have been placed on the grounds of Fort Phantom Hill or its vicinity by the state of Texas. The first, placed in 1936, generally commemorated the fort and was replaced with another marker after the original disappeared in 2010. Another marker, commemorating the fort's use by Confederate forces, was placed on the grounds of the Jones County Courthouse in 1963. A marker for the fort's graveyard was placed in the graveyard in 2019.

Grounds and architecture 
, Fort Phantom Hill consists of three stone structures and 12 stone chimneys standing on a  site.

Before being razed, the fort buildings consisted of jacales with the exception of the officers' quarters, which were built of timber, and the magazine, guardhouse, and commissary, which were built of stone. The structures of the fort were arranged around a parade ground. Officers' quarters lined the north and east sides, opposite the enlisted mens' barracks, while administrative structures stood on the west side. Additional buildings, such as the magazine and bakery, were located away from the parade ground and its surrounding structures.

See also

National Register of Historic Places listings in Jones County, Texas
Texas Forts Trail

Notes

References

Sources

Books and articles

Texas State Historical Association

External links

Reservoirs in Texas
Phantom Hill
Protected areas of Jones County, Texas
Phantom Hill
Butterfield Overland Mail in Texas
Texas in the American Civil War
Buildings and structures in Jones County, Texas
Landforms of Jones County, Texas
National Register of Historic Places in Jones County, Texas
Stagecoach stops in the United States